This is a list of albums that have peaked at number-one on the Oricon Albums Chart, the preeminent singles chart in Japan. Each chart is on a week-ending format. The chart was created on October 5, 1987, and eventually replaced the original LP chart. It monitors the number of physical album purchases of the most popular albums.

1980s

1990s

2000s

2010s

2020s

See also 
 List of best-selling albums in Japan
 Oricon
 List of Oricon number-one singles

External links 
Oricon Weekly Top 50
Record Industry Association of Japan

Japanese music-related lists
Lists of number-one albums in Japan
Number-one albums